is a train station in Gojō, Nara, Japan.

Lines
  JR-West
  Wakayama Line

Platforms and tracks

Surroundings
 Kinki Regional Development Bureau, Ministry of Land, Infrastructure, Transport and Tourism, Wakayama Office of River and National High Way, Gojō Branch office
 Route 24
 City of Gojō Kōzuke Sports Park

External links
 Official website 

Railway stations in Japan opened in 1896
Railway stations in Nara Prefecture